is a Japanese web manga series written and illustrated by Kappi. It was published on cakes web manga service from March 2016 to September 2017. A remake version, illustrated by nifuni, was published on Shueisha's online platform Shōnen Jump+ from October 2017 to October 2022, with its chapters collected in 24 tankōbon volumes. A 10-episode television drama adaptation was broadcast on MBS and TBS from October to December 2019. An anime adaptation has been announced.

Media

Webcomic
Written and illustrated by Kappi, Hidarikiki no Eren was serialized on cakes web manga service from March 24, 2016, to September 21, 2017.

Manga
A manga adaptation, illustrated by nifuni, was published on Shueisha's online platform Shōnen Jump+ from October 7, 2017, to October 8, 2022; an additional chapter was published on December 2 of the same year. Shueisha collected its chapters in 24 tankōbon volumes, released from December 4, 2017, to December 2, 2022.

Volume list

Drama
A 10-episode television drama adaptation that featured Elaiza Ikeda and Fuju Kamio in lead roles was broadcast on MBS and TBS from October 21 to December 23, 2019.

Anime
In December 2022, it was announced that the series will receive an anime adaptation.

Reception
The manga was recommended by manga artist Yuki Suetsugu.

Notes

References

External links
  
  
 

2016 webcomic debuts
2019 Japanese television series debuts
2019 Japanese television series endings
Japanese webcomics
Mainichi Broadcasting System original programming
Shōnen manga
Shueisha manga
TBS Television (Japan) original programming
Webcomics in print